Falkberget is a Norwegian surname. Notable people with the surname include:

Aasta Falkberget (1905–1983), Norwegian writer and painter
Johan Falkberget (1879–1967), Norwegian author
Magnus Falkberget (1900–1957), Norwegian actor, son of Johan

Norwegian-language surnames